A barn is a farm building for livestock and hay storage.  

Barn may also refer to:

Places
 Bärn, German name of the town Moravský Beroun, Czech Republic
 Barn, West Virginia, a community in the United States

Other uses 
 Barn church, specific type of clandestine church
  Barn, a 2021 album by Neil Young and Crazy Horse
 Barn (Welsh magazine), a current affairs magazine from Wales
 Barn (unit), a unit of cross section area used in nuclear and particle physics

See also
 Barnes (disambiguation)
 Broadband 4 Rural North (B4RN), pronounced "barn", a project in England
 Barn theatre (disambiguation)
 The Barn (disambiguation)
 Barn fire
 Barn house